Noah Henry Pagden (born 20 March 2001), is an Australian professional footballer who plays as a defender for Central Coast United.

Club career

Western Sydney Wanderers
On 18 October 2019, Pagden signed his first professional contract with the club, penning a two-year scholarship deal. He made his professional debut as a second-half substitute in a Round 23 clash against Melbourne City, replacing Jarrod Carluccio in the 84th minute in a 1-1 draw.

On 28 December 2021, the club announced that Pagden had departed the club along with Mohamed Adam and Fabian Monge

Central Coast United
On 7 January 2022, Central Coast United announced the signing of Pagden for the 2022 NSW League Two season. He made his debut for the club on 12 March 2022 against Macarthur Rams which ended as a 3–3 draw.

Honours

International
Australia U20
AFF U-19 Youth Championship: 2019

References

External links

2001 births
Living people
Australian soccer players
Association football forwards
Western Sydney Wanderers FC players
National Premier Leagues players
A-League Men players